Sneyder Julián Guevara Muñoz (born 4 May 1992), commonly known as Julián Guevara, is a Colombian footballer who plays as a midfielder for Categoría Primera A side Deportivo Pasto on loan from América de Cali.

Club career
Guevara joined Finnish side PS Kemi in 2017.

Career statistics

Club

Notes

References

External links
 Julián Guevara at MaltaCorner

1992 births
Living people
Colombian footballers
Colombian expatriate footballers
Association football midfielders
América de Cali footballers
Naxxar Lions F.C. players
Kemi City F.C. players
FC Inter Turku players
Deportivo Pasto footballers
Categoría Primera A players
Veikkausliiga players
Colombian expatriate sportspeople in Ecuador
Colombian expatriate sportspeople in Finland
Expatriate footballers in Malta
Expatriate footballers in Ecuador
Expatriate footballers in Finland
Colombian expatriate sportspeople in Malta
Footballers from Cali